The Girl from Frisco (German:Das Mädchen aus Frisco) is a 1927 German silent film directed by Wolfgang Neff and starring Henry Bender, Rudolf Klein-Rogge and Erna Morena.

The film's art direction was by Artur Gunther.

Cast
In alphabetical order
 Henry Bender
 Rudolf Klein-Rogge 
 Erna Morena 
 Hermann Picha 
 Louis Ralph 
 Ernst Rückert 
 Mammey Terja-Basa 
 Helga Thomas 
 Egon von Jordan

References

Bibliography
 Hans-Michael Bock and Tim Bergfelder. The Concise Cinegraph: An Encyclopedia of German Cinema. Berghahn Books.

External links

1927 films
Films of the Weimar Republic
Films directed by Wolfgang Neff
German silent feature films
German black-and-white films